The Hochschule der Bildenden Künste Saar or HBKsaar, (English: Saar College of Fine Arts) is an art and design university in the German State of Saarland.

The degree course offers a choice of different topics: Fine arts, communication design, media art & design and product design. There are also various master study programmes and teacher training programmes in art education.

Noted alumni 

Arvid Boecker (born 1964), color field painter
Wolfgang Kermer (born 1935), art historian and former rector of the State Academy of Fine Arts Stuttgart, studied in 1956/57 with Peter Raacke, Oskar Holweck and Otto Steinert
Ingrid Mwangi (born 1975) also known as "Mwangi Hutter", multidisciplinary artist, known for performance art
Andrea Neumann (1969–2020) painter
Thomas Wagner (born 1977) VR and video game designer, entrepreneur

Noted faculty 

 Bodo Baumgarten, painter
, architect and designer
 , painter
 Christina Kubisch, composer, sound artist, performance artist
Frans Masereel, Flemish painter and graphic artist, taught at HBK from 1949 to 1949.
Cho Sung-hyung, film maker
 , visual artist
 Tamás Waliczky, multidisciplinary media artist, computer animator, cartoonist, illustrator.

References

External links

 Official website

Education in Saarbrücken
Educational institutions established in 1989
Universities and colleges in Saarland
Art schools in Germany
Design schools in Germany
1989 establishments in West Germany